Oozham : It's Just A Matter Of Time is a 2016 Indian action thriller film written and directed by Jeethu Joseph. The film stars Prithviraj Sukumaran, Anson Paul, Neeraj Madhav, Jayaprakash, Divya Pillai, Balachandra Menon and debutant Rasna Pavithran. Shamdat Sainudheen handled the cinematography. The film was shot simultaneously in Malayalam and Tamil. Oozham revolves around a demolition expert who teams up with his fiancée and adopted brother to avenge the deaths of their family members from the corrupt scientist who got them killed.

The film released on 8 September 2016. This film was remade in Marathi as Grey starring Vaibhav Tattvawadi in the lead role.

Plot 
Kovai Krishnamoorthy is a 24×7 health inspector in Kerala, whose son Surya works in US as a demolition expert. While video chatting with his sister Aishwarya, Surya witness some goons murdering his whole family and is left devastated. On the same day, Surya's girlfriend Gayathri's brother SP Parthasarathy is also killed. Surya, along with his adopted brother Ajmal, an ex-software engineer and Gayathri set out to investigate behind the killings. Ajmal remembers that Krishnamoorthy has stored something in his email account which would lead them to deduce about the killings. 

They checks a video in the account and learns that Krishnamoorthy and Parthasarathy were investigating about an epidemic outbreak in Kerala where they learn that Wilfred Marcus, who is the owner of a pharmaceutical company named Alpha Remedies is the mastermind behind Krishnamoorthy's and Parathasarthy's deaths as they were about to expose his involvement in spreading the outbreak and providing medicines for profits. After learning this, Surya, Ajmal and Gayathri heads to the commissioner office to provide the evidence, but they learn that ACP N. Venkatachalapathy is actually in cahoots with Marcus and was also present on the day when his family was killed. 

The trio begins to trail them where they kill Venkatachalapathy in his residence using a bomb implanted on his TV and also kills the company's General Manager Karthikeyan at his office in the same way. Marcus realizes that someone is tailing them and decide to hire "Captain" Anand Chaturanga, an ex-bomb squadron of the Sri Lankan Army who is now freelancer explosive expert to investigate. Gayathri pretend to befriend Marcus's younger son Andrew and manages to kill him by using the same explosive implanted as a phone. After checking the details of the persons who were eliminated by Marcus, they deduce that Surya is behind all this. Anand, Marcus and his elder son Edward heads to leave for Australia, but Surya manages to bomb Edward's car with a magnetic bomb, thus killing him. 

Meanwhile, SP Mohammed Riyas is appointed to investigate the killings, where he learns about Krishnamoorthy and Parthasarathy's murder has a connection with Marcus and deduce that Surya is after Marcus's life and tries to arrest him, but Surya manages to warn him to not interfere in his way. Anand and Marcus announces a reward of 1 crore to find Surya, where a doctor gives away Ajmal and Gayathri's location to Marcus, while Anand tails Surya at his hideout in Coimbatore and manages to capture him. The trio are strapped with a bomb where Marcus heads some distance to see them die  and triggers the bomb, but the bomb doesn't explode and they later realizes that he triggered an explosive in Surya's bag which is in Marcus's car. The bomb explodes which kills Anand, Marcus and his henchmen, while Surya and others leave, thus avenging their injustice.

Cast 
 Prithviraj Sukumaran as Surya Krishnamoorthy
 Divya Pillai as Gayathri
 Rasna Pavithran as Aishwarya  Krishnamoorthy
 Neeraj Madhav as Ajmal Krishnamoorthy
 Balachandra Menon as Kovai Krishnamoorthy 
 Jayaprakash as Wilfred Marcus
 Pasupathy as Captain Anand Chathuranga
 Anson Paul as Edward Marcus
 Tony Luke Kocherry as Andrew Marcus
 Kishor Satya as  SP Parthasarathy
 Seetha as Subulakshmi Krishnamoorthy
 Irshad as SP Niyas Mohammed
 Dinesh Prabhakar as Selvam 
 Anand as Karthikeyan

Crew 
 Director and writer – Jeethu Joseph
 Producers – G. George and Anto Padinjarekkara
 Director of Photography – Shamdat Sainudeen
 Music director – Anil Johnson
 Editor – Ayoob Khan
 Lyricist – Santhosh Varma
 Art director – Saburam
 Costume designer – Linta Jeethu
 Makeup designer – Ranjith Ambady
 Visual Effects – Tony Macmyth
 Production Controller – Vinod Managalath

Production 
After completing Life of Josutty, director Jeethu Joseph announced his next film entitled Oozham which features Prithviraj Sukumaran in the lead. The film marks the second collaboration of Jeethu and Prithviraj who had worked earlier in the 2013 crime thriller film Memories.

Release
The film released on 8 September 2016 in 97 screens in Kerala.

Box office
The film collected 1.25 crore in the opening day from Kerala box office. The first 4 days weekend collection is estimated at 4.45 crore. The film grossed 15.25 crore in 25 days run from Kerala box office.

References

External links
 

2016 action thriller films
2010s chase films
Indian action thriller films
Indian chase films
Indian films about revenge
Films directed by Jeethu Joseph
2010s Malayalam-language films